Somebody's Knocking is the eleventh studio album by American singer Mark Lanegan (credited to "Mark Lanegan Band"). It was released through Heavenly Recordings on October 18, 2019.

Critical reception

The Guardian wrote that the album "is limited to trying to re-create the mood of Manchester in the 1980s ... you can’t help but laugh at the brazenness of it." Clash called it "probably the most cheerful album Lanegan has released under his own name, despite still sounding like Joy Division at their moodiest."

Track listing

Personnel
 Mark Lanegan – vocals (1-14)
 Alain Johannes – synths (1-6, 8, 10, 12, 13), melodica (2), guitar (2, 4-6, 10, 12, 13), drum machine (2, 3, 5, 6, 8, 12, 13), saxophone (3, 10), background vocals (3, 6, 8, 9), bass (8, 13), percussion (8)
 Rob Marshall – guitar (1, 5, 10, 13), bass (1, 14), piano (1, 14), drum programming (1, 5, 10, 13, 14), synths (10, 13, 14)
 Sietse van Gorkom – guitar (2, 3, 6, 7, 9, 11, 12), bass (2, 9, 11), drum programming (2, 7, 9, 11), synths (3, 7, 9, 12), noise FX (3), mellotron (9), percussion (9), organ (11)
 Martin Jenkins – synths (4), drum programming (4)
 Martyn LeNoble – bass (3, 5, 6, 10)
 Greg Dulli – guitar (2), background vocals (2)
 Freek Cerutti – bass (7)
 Tom Nieuwenhuijs – drums (3, 6, 11, 12)
 Shelley Brien – background vocals (6, 9)

Charts
r

References

2019 albums
Mark Lanegan albums
Albums produced by Alain Johannes
Heavenly Recordings albums